The 2013 Aircel Chennai Open – Doubles was a 2013 ATP World Tour doubles tennis tournament, played on outdoor hard courts. 

Leander Paes and Janko Tipsarević were the defending champions but Tipsarević decided not to participate.
Paes played alongside Edouard Roger-Vasselin, but they lost in the first round.

Benoît Paire and Stanislas Wawrinka defeated Andre Begemann and Martin Emmrich 6–2, 6–1 in the final to win the title.

Seeds

Draw

Draw

References
 Main Draw

Doubles